Cyclotheca is a genus of fungi in the Microthyriaceae family.

Species
As accepted by Species Fungorum;

 Cyclotheca batistae 
 Cyclotheca filici 
 Cyclotheca freycinetiae 
 Cyclotheca iochromatis 
 Cyclotheca jasmini 
 Cyclotheca kamatii 
 Cyclotheca licaniae 
 Cyclotheca loranthi 
 Cyclotheca lucumae 
 Cyclotheca melastomatis 
 Cyclotheca miconiae 
 Cyclotheca microthyrioides 
 Cyclotheca myodocarpi 
 Cyclotheca nervicola 
 Cyclotheca pulchella 
 Cyclotheca sordidula 
 Cyclotheca symploci 

Former species; Cyclotheca bosciae  = Hysterostomella bosciae Parmulariaceae

References

External links
Index Fungorum

Microthyriales